Akhnaten Spencer-El (born April 13, 1979) is an American sabre fencer. He competed in the individual sabre event at the 2000 Summer Olympics, finishing 34th. Akhnaten Spencer-El joined the Columbia University fencing coaching staff in September 2013. He served as a coach for the United States in the 2016 Olympics in Rio.

See also
List of USFA Division I National Champions

References

External links
 

1979 births
Living people
American male sabre fencers
Olympic fencers of the United States
Fencers at the 2000 Summer Olympics
Sportspeople from Baltimore
Pan American Games medalists in fencing
Pan American Games silver medalists for the United States
Pan American Games bronze medalists for the United States
Fencers at the 1999 Pan American Games
Medalists at the 1999 Pan American Games